Giovanni Venturini (born 9 November 1991 in Vicenza) is a professional racing driver from Italy.

Career

Formula 2000 Light
Venturini began his Formula racing career in November 2008, racing in the Formula 2000 Light Italy Winter Trophy, where he finished as runner–up in the two–race series behind Martin Scuncio. The following season, he took part in the opening round of the main Formula 2000 Light season at Magione. He finished on the podium in both races, winning one of them, but as the event didn't count towards the championship he received no points.

Formula Renault 2.0
In late 2008, Venturini took part in the Portuguese Formula Renault 2.0 Winter Series, held over two rounds at Jerez and Estoril, finishing tied on points with Adrian Quaife–Hobbs in 7th place.

2009 saw Venturini tackle dual–campaigns in the Italian Formula Renault 2.0 and Swiss Formula Renault 2.0 series with CO2 Motorsport. Despite missing the second round at Varano, he finished the Italian season third overall, recording nine podiums including a win at Misano. In the Swiss Championship, he took three race wins and a total of ten podium places en–route to the runner–up spot behind Jenzer Motorsport's Nico Müller.

In 2010, Venturini graduated to the premier Eurocup Formula Renault 2.0 series with the Spanish Epsilon Euskadi team. Racing with the brand–new Barazi–Epsilon designed chassis, Venturini finished the season fifth overall, taking two podium finishes including a win at Magny–Cours. He also took part in the British Formula Renault 2.0 support round at the Silverstone World Series by Renault meeting, finishing the two races in 16th and 14th places respectively, and also made an outing in the Formula Renault 2.0 Northern European Cup round at Spa–Francorchamps, taking a pole position for one of the three races.

Auto GP
In January 2011, Venturini took part in a two–day Auto GP test session held at the Circuit Ricardo Tormo near Valencia, finishing as the fastest driver on the first day. Early the following month he was confirmed at the Durango team for the 2011 season, racing alongside fellow Italian driver Giuseppe Cipriani. He took his first series victory in the opening race of the season at Monza after starting from pole position. Another podium finish came at the following round at the Hungaroring before Venturini won his second race of the year at Oschersleben in July.

Formula Renault 3.5 Series
In October 2010, Venturini drove a Formula Renault 3.5 Series car for the first time, driving for Epsilon Euskadi and Junior Lotus Racing in the two–day test session held at the Circuit de Catalunya. The following week, he was one of 25 drivers invited by Renault Sport Technologies to participate in the next FR3.5 Series test session, held at Motorland Aragón in Spain, as a reward for finishing fifth in the Formula Renault 2.0 Eurocup.

After testing extensively for Draco Racing and Fortec Motorsport in late 2011, Venturini will graduate to the series in 2012, joining Nikolay Martsenko at Italian team BVM Target.

Racing record

Career summary

† – As Venturini was a guest driver, he was ineligible for championship points.
* Season still in progress.

Complete Auto GP results
(key) (Races in bold indicate pole position) (Races in italics indicate fastest lap)

Complete Formula Renault 3.5 Series results
(key) (Races in bold indicate pole position) (Races in italics indicate fastest lap)

Complete GP3 Series results
(key) (Races in bold indicate pole position) (Races in italics indicate fastest lap)

Complete Blancpain GT Series Sprint Cup results

References

External links
 
 
 

1991 births
Living people
Sportspeople from Vicenza
Italian racing drivers
Formula Renault Eurocup drivers
British Formula Renault 2.0 drivers
Italian Formula Renault 2.0 drivers
Formula Renault 2.0 NEC drivers
Formula Renault 2.0 Alps drivers
Portuguese Formula Renault 2.0 drivers
Auto GP drivers
World Series Formula V8 3.5 drivers
Italian GP3 Series drivers
International GT Open drivers
Blancpain Endurance Series drivers
24 Hours of Spa drivers
GT World Challenge America drivers
Epsilon Euskadi drivers
Durango drivers
Trident Racing drivers
BVM Target drivers
Lamborghini Squadra Corse drivers